Lookout for Hope is the third album by Bill Frisell, released in 1988 on ECM. It contains performances by Frisell, cellist Hank Roberts, bassist Kermit Driscoll and drummer Joey Baron.

Reception
The AllMusic review by Michael G. Nastos stated: "With Lookout for Hope, Bill Frisell is not so much setting trends and fashion as he is establishing a fresh sound, utterly unique from all others, and laying a foundation for many things to come."

Track listing
All compositions by Bill Frisell except as indicated.
 "Lookout for Hope" – 6:30
 "Little Brother Bobby" – 7:04
 "Hangdog" – 2:26
 "Remedios the Beauty" – 6:23
 "Lonesome" – 4:40
 "Melody for Jack" – 3:28
 "Hackensack" (Monk) – 2:57
 "Little Bigger" – 3:16
 "The Animal Race" – 2:02
 "Alien Prints" – 6:28

Personnel
Bill Frisell – electric and acoustic guitars, banjo
Hank Roberts – cello and voice
Kermit Driscoll – bass
Joey Baron – drums

References 

1988 albums
Bill Frisell albums
ECM Records albums